Cribriform (Latin for "perforated") can refer to:
 Cribriform plate
 Cribriform pattern of histopathological architecture
 Fascia cribrosa